The 63rd edition of the Liège–Bastogne–Liège road cycling race in Belgium was held on 24 April 1977. French rider Bernard Hinault won his first monument classic, after beating André Dierickx in a two-man sprint.

Summary
Six riders – Eddy Merckx, Roger De Vlaeminck, Freddy Maertens, André Dierickx, Dietrich Thurau and Bernard Hinault – were in front of the race. While all eyes were on Eddy Merckx, André Dierickx launched an attack at 8 km from the finish. Frenchman Bernard Hinault was the only one to respond and beat Dierickx in the sprint. A faltering Merckx, in his final display in Liège, finished a disappointing sixth.

The race was run in bad weather, with cold and rain affecting riders. Only 24 of 143 riders finished the race.

Results

References

External links
 Official website
 Complete results (in French)

1977
1977 in road cycling
1977 in Belgian sport
1977 Super Prestige Pernod